Fifth Street was a train station along the Evergreen Branch of the Long Island Rail Road that opened in 1878 at Fifth Street, which later became Driggs Street, then finally Driggs Avenue. Fifth Street was 3 minutes away from Greenpoint Terminal. The station closed in 1879. This is also evident as Fifth Street isn't mentioned on the 1880 season timetable.

References

External links
EVERGREEN BRANCH: another lost LIRR line (Forgotten New York)
Bushwick Branch Approximation
Arrts Archives Map of Evergreen Branch
Arrts Archives THE L.I.R.R.'S EVERGREEN BRANCH

Former Long Island Rail Road stations in New York City
Railway stations closed in 1879
Railway stations in the United States opened in 1878
Railway stations in Brooklyn
1878 establishments in New York (state)
1879 establishments in New York (state)
Williamsburg, Brooklyn